Heliaeschna trinervulata is a species of dragonfly in the family Aeshnidae. It is known commonly as the pale duskhawker. This dragonfly is found in Cameroon, the Democratic Republic of the Congo, Malawi, Mozambique, Tanzania, Uganda, Zambia, and possibly Nigeria. Its natural habitat is subtropical or tropical moist lowland forests.

References

Aeshnidae
Insects described in 1955
Taxonomy articles created by Polbot